RL, Rl or rl may refer to:

In arts and entertainment
 Radio Liberty, US broadcaster
 Rocket League, a video game

Businesses and organizations
 Polo Ralph Lauren (NYSE stock ticker symbol)
 Réseau Luxembourgeois des Amateurs d'Ondes Courtes, an amateur radio organization in Luxembourg
 Royal Phnom Penh Airways (IATA code)

People known by the given initials
 R. L. Huggar, an R&B singer
 RL Grime, American musician, producer

In science and technology
 RL (complexity), a complexity class of mathematical problems
 RL circuit, a circuit with a resistor and an inductor
 Reinforcement learning, an area of machine learning
 Reduced level, elevations of survey points with reference to a common assumed datum.
 Rhyncholaelia (Rl.), a genus of orchids

Other uses
 Rl (digraph) in Australian Aboriginal languages
 Acura RL, an automobile
 Real life, Internet term
 Registered Locksmith, US certification
 Report Long, a type of US Congressional Research Service Report
 Rugby league, a sport